The Saʿada (singular Saʿdawi) and Murabtin (singular Murabit) form a twofold social  division within the Bedouins of western Egypt and eastern Libya.

In modern times, the term Murabit contrasts with Saʿdawi and marks a division of social status among the Bedouin component of the population of this region, where the Murabtin are of lower status.
The existence of such a division  is a sensitive issue, and its continued observation in Matruh is discouraged by the Egyptian government. Likewise, categorization of the Murabtin as either Arab Bedouins or Arab-Berber or Arabized Berber  may be subject to disagreement.

The etymology of murābiṭ is unclear. It is interpreted as "the tied" (c.f. marabout), but it is also derived from ribaṭ, the term for a border fortress.

References
Donald Powell Cole, Soraya Altorki, "The Saʿada and the Murabtin", Bedouin, settlers, and holiday-makers: Egypt's changing northwest coast, American Univ in Cairo Press, 1998, pp. 51-56.

Nomads 
Bedouins in Egypt 
Bedouins in Libya 
Ethnic groups in Libya 
Ethnic groups in Egypt
Society of Libya